This is a list of Portugal's municipalities by population, according to the estimate of the resident population for the Census 2021 made by the National Statistics Institute (INE).

The 308 Portuguese municipalities are divided among the 25 sub-regions and the 7 national regions, the population density of each municipality, and the area it totals.

About 65% of the national population, 6.716.691 inhabitants, live in the 56 municipalities with more than 50.000 inhabitants, about 18% of all national municipalities. While there are 121 municipalities, about 39% of all national municipalities, with a population of less than 10.000 inhabitants, a total of 672.516 inhabitants, about 6,5% of the national population.

See also

 Subdivisions of Portugal
 List of cities in Portugal
 List of towns in Portugal
 List of municipalities of Portugal
 List of parishes of Portugal
 List of cities in Europe

References

External links
 National Association of Portuguese Municipalities

Cities
Portugal, List of Cities in
 
05